Black Soul Choir is the second studio album by Norwegian heavy metal band Wolves Like Us. It was released in February 2014 under Prosthetic Records.

Track list

References

2014 albums